Highly charged ions (HCI) are ions in very high charge states due to the loss of many or most of their bound electrons by energetic collisions or high-energy photon absorption. Examples are 13-fold ionized iron,  or Fe XIV in spectroscopic notation, found in the Sun's corona, or naked uranium,  (U XCIII in spectroscopic notation), bare all bound electrons, which requires very high energy for its production. HCI are found in stellar corona, in active galactic nuclei, in supernova remnants, and in accretion disks. Most of the visible matter found in the universe consists of highly charged ions. High temperature plasmas used for nuclear fusion energy research also contain HCI generated by the plasma-wall interaction (see Tokamak). In the laboratory, HCI are investigated by means of heavy ion particle accelerators and electron beam ion traps. They might have applications in improving atomic clocks, advances in quantum computing, and more accurate measurement of fundamental physical constants.

References 

Atomic physics
Astrophysics